John Curran (born September 11, 1960) is an American film director and screenwriter.

Life and career
Born in Utica, New York, Curran studied illustration and design at Syracuse University, then worked as an illustrator, graphic designer, and production designer in Manhattan before moving to Sydney, Australia in 1986. There he worked on television commercials before writing and directing the short film Down Rusty Down. For his debut feature film, the 1998 drama Praise, he was nominated for the Australian Film Institute Award for Best Direction and won the Film Critics Circle of Australia Award for Best Director and the International Critics' Award at the Toronto International Film Festival.

Six years passed before Curran tackled his next project, the independent film We Don't Live Here Anymore, for which he was nominated for the Grand Special Prize at the Deauville American Film Festival and the Grand Jury Prize at the Sundance Film Festival. He followed this two years later with The Painted Veil, the third screen adaptation of the 1925 novel by W. Somerset Maugham.

He wrote the screenplay for The Killer Inside Me, the second film adaptation of the 1952 novel by Jim Thompson. Directed by Michael Winterbottom and starring Jessica Alba, Kate Hudson, Casey Affleck, and Bill Pullman, it was filmed in Oklahoma. He also is set to direct The Beautiful and Damned, a Zelda and F. Scott Fitzgerald biopic starring Keira Knightley. In October 2012, he began filming an adaptation of Robyn Davidson's Tracks, starring Mia Wasikowska, in Australia.

He lives in Pittsford, New York.

Filmography

Feature films
 Praise (1998) - Director
 We Don't Live Here Anymore (2004) - Director
 The Painted Veil (2006) - Director/Executive producer
 The Killer Inside Me (2010) - Writer
 Stone (2010) - Director
 Tracks (2013) - Director
 Chappaquiddick (2017) - Director
 The Beautiful and the Damned (TBA) - Director

Short films
 Down Rusty Down (1996) - Director

References

External links

Real Time/On Screen interview 

American male screenwriters
Writers from Utica, New York
Syracuse University alumni
1960 births
Living people
People from Pittsford, New York
Film directors from New York (state)
Screenwriters from New York (state)